The Breakthrough Party is a minor political party in the United Kingdom. The party describes itself as a "new home for those determined to disrupt the failed status quo and build an alternative: a society that uses its considerable wealth to provide dignity, security and justice for all". The party's constitution declares it to be a democratic socialist party. It was registered with the Electoral Commission in January 2021.

History 
The Breakthrough Party was founded in 2021 by Alex Mays, a former member of the Labour Party, in response to the 2020 Labour Party leadership election.

On 20 January 2022, it was announced that a "memorandum of understanding" had been agreed between Breakthrough, the Northern Independence Party, the Trade Unionist and Socialist Coalition and Left Unity under the name Peoples Alliance of The Left (PAL) and organised by former Labour MP Thelma Walker. This alliance will work together on a future electoral strategy. On 29 January 2022, PAL came out in support of Dave Nellist's candidacy in the 2022 Birmingham Erdington by election.

In mid August the party released their manifesto, covering a broad range of policy aims in community, democracy, economy, education, environment, equality, foreign policy, health, housing, immigration, independent living, justice, media, culture and sport, transport and work. The manifesto, titled a "minifesto" stated in its foreword "Our aim is simple: to offer a genuine alternative in a political landscape which is lurching further rightwards."

Elections and elected representatives 
The party's first appearance on a ballot paper was in the 2021 Chesham and Amersham by-election, when Carla Gregory, a charity worker from the local area, stood. She received 197 votes, which represents 0.5 per cent of the vote.

Various sitting town and parish councillors have defected to Breakthrough. On 16 August 2021 Samantha Cooper, a Labour councillor on Keighley Town Council, defected from the Labour Party and became the first Breakthrough elected representative. On 12 November, a second Labour town councillor, Katie Parker of Bury St Edmunds Town Council, defected to the Breakthrough Party, and on 16 November the chair of Thorngumbald Parish Council, Ben Munro, also defected from Labour to Breakthrough. On 27 January 2022, Owen Hurcum, Mayor of Bangor, and a former member of Plaid Cymru, announced that they had joined the Party and was to serve the rest of their term as a Breakthrough Party representative. On 4 February 2022, Jonathan A. Graham, a councillor on Folkestone Town Council, defected from Labour to Breakthrough. On 24 February 2022, a Labour town councillor in Westgate-on-Sea, Tim Green, announced his intention to defect to the Breakthrough Party.

On 8 March 2022, two borough councillors, Veena Siva and Jenny Vinson, originally elected for Labour on Spelthorne Borough Council had defected to the party, giving Breakthrough its first representation on a principal authority.

In the 2022 United Kingdom local elections two candidates stood for the Breakthrough Party: Nazma Meah in the Aston ward for the 2022 Birmingham City Council election and Ewan Chappell in the Penygroes ward for the 2022 Carmarthenshire County Council election. In the Aston ward in Birmingham, two seats were available; Nazma Meah, finished 5th out of 9 candidates with 265 votes, above both Conservative Party candidates. In the Penygroes seat of Carmarthenshire County Council, one seat was available and the party's candidate, Ewan Chappell, finished last of 4 candidates with 87 votes, equating to 9% of the vote.

On 15 May 2022, Oscar Wolf was appointed deputy leader of the party after elections triggered by the resignation of Sherilyn Wileman.

Policies 
The party has ten core policies listed on its website: a "£16 minimum wage",https://twitter.com/BThroughParty/status/1576670188254396416  scrapping zero hour contracts and banning "fire and rehire", "renationalisation of the NHS and social care", "genuinely affordable housing, for need not profit", limiting rents to 30 per cent of local income and an end to no-fault evictions, a universal basic income, "publicly owned utilities, transport and broadband", defence of the right to protest "and stand in solidarity with marginalised communities", an effort to "collaborate across borders to build a global Green New Deal", and proportional representation.

References

External links
 Official website

2021 establishments in the United Kingdom
Democratic socialist parties in Europe
Labour Party (UK) breakaway groups
Political parties established in 2021
Political parties supporting universal basic income
Socialist parties in the United Kingdom